HMS Vestal was a 28-gun Enterprise-class sixth-rate frigate of the Royal Navy.

American Revolutionary War

Vestal was first commissioned in November 1779 under the command of Captain George Keppel.

On 3 September 1780, she captured Mercury which was transporting Henry Laurens, the United States' minister to Holland.

On 15 March 1783 the British frigates  and Vesta, and Duc de Chartres captured the Massachusetts letter of marque Julius Caesar. Julius Caesar was a privateer of eighteen 9-pounder guns and carried a crew of 100 men under the command of Captain Thomas Benson, of Salem. Her captors sent her into New York City where the Vice admiralty court condemned her. Vestal also captured the ship Tyger, taken to the Court of Vice-Admiralty in Bermuda.

French Revolutionary Wars

Vestal took part in the action of 22 August 1795 between British and Dutch frigate squadrons off the Norwegian coast.

On 14 April 1797, Vestal, under the command of Captain Charles White, captured the French privateer schooner Voltiguer, formerly the lugger Venguer, some seven leagues off Flamborough Head. Voltiguer was armed with eight 3-pounder guns and eight swivel guns, and had a crew of 40 men, 14 of whom were away on prizes. She was 12 days out of Calais and had captured a brig and two sloops. White took Voltiguer into the Humber.

Next, Vestal  captured Jalouse at about 5a.m. on 13 May near Elsinor after a chase of about nine hours and running about 84 hours. For an hour and a half during the chase Jalouse fired her stern chasers (two long 12-pounder guns). White was able to bring Vestal alongside Jalouse and fired three broadsides before she struck, having suffered great damage to her masts and rigging. At the time of capture, Jalouse had 16 guns, though she was pierced for 20, and had shifted some guns to the vacant ports. The armament consisted of twelve "very long 12-pounders", and four 6-pounder guns. Her commander, "C. Plucket", had a crew of 153 men, two of whom were killed and five of whom were wounded. Vestal suffered no casualties. Vestal brought Jalouse into the Humber.

Because Vestal served in the navy's Egyptian campaign (8 March to 2 September 1801), her officers and crew qualified for the clasp "Egypt" to the Naval General Service Medal that the Admiralty authorized in 1850 to all surviving claimants.

Notes and citations
Notes

Citations

References 
 Robert Gardiner, The First Frigates, Conway Maritime Press, London 1992. .
 David Lyon, The Sailing Navy List, Conway Maritime Press, London 1993. .
 Rif Winfield, British Warships in the Age of Sail, 1714 to 1792, Seaforth Publishing, London 2007. .

1779 ships
Sixth-rate frigates of the Royal Navy